Alabama's 8th congressional district, now obsolete, was established in 1877.

Alabama currently has seven congressional districts represented in the United States House of Representatives.

According to the U.S. Census Bureau, Alabama was apportioned eight congressional seats as a result of the 1880 census. In 1893-1913 there were nine seats, and in 1913-1933 there were ten seats, the maximum ever for Alabama. In 1970, Alabama lost its eighth seat when population growth slowed to qualify for only seven seats.

The 8th seat was elected at-large from the entire state until the 45th Congress, when an 8th district was established as a separate district in the northwestern part of the state. The district occupied an area now held by Alabama's 5th congressional district, with the exception of a portion of Morgan County, which is part of the 4th district. Franklin County, which was part of the 8th district until after the 1890 Census, is also part of the modern 4th district.

The district was eliminated in reapportionment at the end of the 92nd United States Congress in 1973. Robert E. Jones Jr. was the district's last representative.

History 
The district was eliminated in the 1970 redistricting cycle after the 1970 United States census.

List of members representing the district

References
Specific

General
Population data from U.S. Census Bureau: Population of Counties by Decennial Census: 1900 to 1990
1880 and 1870 Census data from U.S. Census Bureau: Compendium of the Tenth Census, Volume 1. (1883)
Additional population data and counties from the Official Congressional Directories of the 45th Congress (1878); 48th Congress (1883); 53rd Congress (1893); 58th Congress (1903); 81st Congress (1950); 83rd Congress (1953); and 89th Congress (1965).

Congressional Biographical Directory of the United States 1774–present

08
Former congressional districts of the United States
Constituencies established in 1873
1873 establishments in Alabama
Constituencies disestablished in 1963
1963 disestablishments in Alabama
Constituencies established in 1965
1965 establishments in Alabama
1973 disestablishments in Alabama
Constituencies disestablished in 1973